The Road Runner Show is an American Saturday morning animated anthology series which compiled theatrical Wile E. Coyote and the Road Runner cartoons from the Looney Tunes and Merrie Melodies, which were produced by Warner Bros. Cartoons between 1949 and 1964. Several of the shorts, especially the ones produced from 1965 onward, were produced by DePatie–Freleng Enterprises after Warner Bros. closed their animation studio. DePatie–Freleng Enterprises provided the animation for the show's intro, closing credits as well as the wrap-around bumpers.

Background
From 1966 to 1968, The Road Runner Show initially ran for two seasons on CBS. From 1968 to 1969, CBS combined The Road Runner Show with The Bugs Bunny Show to produce The Bugs Bunny/Road Runner Hour. The Road Runner and the Coyote more often shared at least an hour with Bugs Bunny on CBS. In 1971, ABC picked up The Road Runner Show and ran for two seasons until 1973, when the network dropped the show due to its excessively aggressive scenes. Later on, CBS re-acquired the show and aired them as reruns under The Bugs Bunny/Road Runner Hour until the mid-80s.

Each show would feature one Road Runner/Coyote cartoon, with a Tweety and Sylvester cartoon in the middle segment, and other WB animated character(s) in the third segment (usually Elmer Fudd, Foghorn Leghorn, Speedy Gonzales, Pepé Le Pew and Hippety Hopper). The intro of every cartoon was replaced with a simple title card, along with the shortened version of William Lava's arrangement of The Merry-Go-Round Broke Down.

Internationally 
The show aired in Albania on Bang Bang and Çufo, and in Hungary on M1 and RTL Klub.

Theme song
The theme song was written and performed by Barbara Cameron. In 1999, it was covered by the Mexican band Chicos de Barrio and was later parodied in Histeria! featuring Father Time and Big Fat Baby. It has also been covered by Barenaked Ladies, and Barbara Cameron re-recorded the theme with her son, Jazz violinist Doug Cameron (with Paul Julian's iconic Beep-Beep and other sound effects from the shorts used on the recording) for his Different Hats album in 2008. An instrumental version was used as the theme song for the Road Runner and Wile E. Coyote segments of The Looney Tunes Show.

Episodes (Season 3)

Cast
Paul Julian as The Road Runner 
Mel Blanc as Sylvester, Tweety
June Foray as Granny (in "The Jet Cage" segment)
Additional voices provided by Bea Benaderet and Hal Smith

Trivia 

 About 27 Road Runner cartoons and 26 Tweety and Sylvester cartoons are included in this show, with the first episode being the only episode to contain two Road Runner cartoons sandwiching one Tweety and Sylvester cartoon.
 Among the third segments of each episode, the show contained three Elmer Fudd cartoons (only one featuring Daffy Duck), two Pepé Le Pew cartoons, four Speedy Gonzales cartoons (all co-starring Sylvester, one shared with the Road Runner), two Ralph Wolf and Sam Sheepdog cartoons, four Foghorn Leghorn cartoons, and two one-shot cartoons directed by Chuck Jones. Of all 26 episodes, Sylvester appeared in eleven of these third segments, and among the minor characters in the Sylvester cartoons, Spike and Chester co-star in only one, while Hippety Hopper co-stars in four (three featuring Sylvester Junior), while Sylvester Jr. co-stars in six (three featuring Hippety Hopper).
 Despite the third segments' title card depicting Yosemite Sam, no Yosemite Sam cartoons are aired in this show. No Bugs Bunny or Porky Pig cartoons are included in any episode of this show either because they each had a show of their own.
 Of all the 27 Road Runner cartoons aired in this show, Chuck Jones has the most with fifteen, followed by Rudy Larriva with nine, Robert McKimson with two and Friz Freleng with one.
 Almost all the Sylvester cartoons aired in the third segments in this show are directed by Robert McKimson, except for "Chili Weather", "Dr. Jerkyl's Hide", "Cats and Bruises" and "The Wild Chase", which are directed by Friz Freleng. In addition, all three Elmer Fudd cartoons in this show are directed by Robert McKimson.
 Despite both the opening and closing sequences of this show including clips from "Chaser on the Rocks", "Hip Hip- Hurry!" and "Wild About Hurry", none of these are included in any episode.

See also
The Bugs Bunny Show
Adventures of the Road Runner

References

External links
The Road Runner Show Page, by Kevin McCorry; retrieved 25 November 2018

1960s American animated television series
1970s American animated television series
1966 American television series debuts
1968 American television series endings
1971 American television series debuts
1973 American television series endings
1960s American anthology television series
1970s American anthology television series
American Broadcasting Company original programming
American children's animated anthology television series
Animated television series about birds
CBS original programming
English-language television shows
Looney Tunes television series
Television series by Warner Bros. Television Studios
Wile E. Coyote and the Road Runner